In psychoacoustics and signal processing, a pure tone is a sound or a signal with a sinusoidal waveform; that is, a sine wave of any frequency, phase-shift, and amplitude. 

A pure tone has the property – unique among real-valued wave shapes – that its wave shape is unchanged by linear time-invariant systems; that is, only the phase and amplitude change between such a system's pure-tone input and its output.

Sine and cosine waves can be used as basic building blocks of more complex waves.  As additional sine waves having different frequencies are combined, the waveform transforms from a sinusoidal shape into a more complex shape.

In clinical audiology, pure tones are used for pure-tone audiometry to characterize hearing thresholds at different frequencies.
Sound localization is often more difficult with pure tones than with other sounds.

Relation to pitch and musical tones 

Pure tones have been used by 19th century physicists like Georg Ohm and Hermann von Helmholtz to support theories asserting that the ear functions in a way equivalent to a Fourier frequency analysis. In Ohm's acoustic law, later further elaborated by  Helmholtz, musical tones are perceived as a set of pure tones. The percept of pitch depends on the frequency of the most prominent tone, and the phases of the individual components is discarded. This theory has often been blamed for creating a confusion between pitch, frequency and pure tones.

Unlike musical tones that are composed of the sum of a number of harmonically related sinusoidal components, pure tones only contain one such sinusoidal waveform. When presented in isolation, and when its frequency pertains to a certain range, pure tones give rise to a single pitch percept, which can be characterized by its frequency. In this situation, the instantaneous phase of the pure tone varies linearly with time. If a pure tone gives rise to a constant, steady-state percept, then it can be concluded that its phase does not influence this percept. However, when multiple pure tones are presented at once, like in musical tones, their relative phase plays a role in the resulting percept. In such a situation, the perceived pitch is not determined by the frequency of any individual component, but by the frequency relationship between these components (see missing fundamental).

See also 
 Sound
 Pitch (music)
 Musical tone
 Missing fundamental
 Spectral flatness

References 

Hearing
Psychoacoustics
Sound
Acoustics